Thomas Birkmann (born 18 October 1955) is a German philologist who specializes in Germanic studies.

Biography
Thomas Birkmann was born un Düsseldorf on 18 October 1955. He received his Ph.D. in Germanic philology at the University of Freiburg in 1986, and habilitated at the University of Freiburg in 1933 with a thesis on runes. Since 2000, Birkmann has been an associate professor of Germanic philology at the University of Freiburg.

Selected works
 Präteritopräsentia. Morphologische Entwicklungen einer Sonderklasse in den altgermanischen Sprachen. Niemeyer, Tübingen 1986.
 Von Ågedal bis Malt. Die skandinavischen Runeninschriften vom Ende des 5. bis Ende des 9. Jahrhunderts. de Gruyter, Berlin/New York 1995.
 (Contributor) Vergleichende Germanische Philologie und Skandinavistik. Fest- und Gedenkschrift für Otmar Werner zum 65. Geburtstag. Niemeyer, Tübingen 1997.

See also
 Wilhelm Heizmann
 Heinrich Beck
 Rudolf Simek
 Robert Nedoma

Sources
  (Hrsg.): Linguisten-Handbuch. Biographische und bibliographische Daten deutschsprachiger Sprachwissenschaftlerinnen und Sprachwissenschaftler der Gegenwart. Bd. 1, Gunter Narr Verlag, Tübingen 1997, S. 78f. (mit Foto)
 Kürschners Deutscher Gelehrten-Kalender 2013. Bio- bibliographisches Verzeichnis deutschsprachiger Wissenschaftler der Gegenwart. 1. Teilband, De Gruyter, Berlin/Boston (25. Ausgabe) 2013, . (Geistes- und Sozialwissenschaften)

1955 births
People from Düsseldorf
University of Freiburg alumni
Academic staff of the University of Freiburg
German male non-fiction writers
German philologists
Germanic studies scholars
Living people
Runologists